The 1954 Ladies Open Championships was held at the Lansdowne Club in London from 15–21 February 1954. Janet Morgan won her fifth consecutive title defeating Sheila Speight in the final.

Seeds

Draw and results

First round

denotes seed *

Second round

Third round

Quarter-finals

Semi-finals

Final

References

Women's British Open Squash Championships
Women's British Open Squash Championships
Women's British Open Squash Championships
Squash competitions in London
Women's British Open Championships
British Open Championships 
Women's British Open Squash Championships